The 1980–81 Norwegian 1. Divisjon season was the 42nd season of ice hockey in Norway. Ten teams participated in the league, and Stjernen won the championship.

Regular season

Playoffs

External links 
 Norwegian Ice Hockey Federation

Nor
GET-ligaen seasons
1980 in Norwegian sport
1981 in Norwegian sport